The Streltsy uprising of 1698 was an uprising of the Moscow Streltsy regiments.

Background

Some Russian historians believe that the Streltsy uprising represented a reactionary rebellion against the progressive innovations of Peter the Great, who had left the country on a tour of cities in northern and western Europe at the time. Others see it as a riot against the yoke of serfdom oppression, military-service hardships and harassment.

The Moscow Streltsy, who had participated in Peter the Great's Azov campaigns in 1695–1696, remained in Azov as a garrison. In 1697, however, the four regiments of Streltsy were unexpectedly sent to Velikiye Luki instead of Moscow. On their way there they were starving and carrying their ordnance by themselves, due to lack of horses. In March 1698, 175 Streltsy left their regiments and fled to Moscow to file a complaint. They secretly established contact with Sophia Alekseyevna, who had been incarcerated at the Novodevichy Monastery, and hoped for her mediation. The runaway Streltsy, despite their resistance, were sent back to their regiments, giving rise to discontent among the rest of them.

Uprising
On 6 June, the Streltsy removed their commanding officers, chose four electives from each regiment, and made their way to Moscow, getting ready to punish the boyars and foreign advisers and blaming them for all adversities. The rebels (approx. 2,300 men) intended to install Sophia or, in case of her refusal, her alleged lover Vasili Golitsyn, who had been in exile. Peter I ordered four regiments (4,000 men) and a cavalry unit under the command of Aleksey Shein and Patrick Gordon to attack the Streltsy. On 18 June, the Streltsy were defeated not far from the New Jerusalem Monastery (Voskresensky Monastery) 40 km west of Moscow.

Aftermath
Peter employed savage tortures while investigating the incident. Many suspects were whipped to death with the knout, an extremely stout leather whip composed of numerous twisted strands. Many were stretched until their limbs broke; sophisticated iron thumbscrews were applied to the fingers and toes of some prisoners; while others had their backs slowly roasted or had their flanks and bare feet slowly torn apart with red-hot iron pincers. Peter thus induced suspect after suspect to name accomplices in a virtually unending cavalcade of forced, and likely often false, confessions.

As a result of a major investigation, 57 Streltsy were executed and the rest sent into exile. Upon his hurried return from London on 25 August 1698, Peter I ordered another investigation. Between September 1698 and February 1699, 1,182 Streltsy were executed and 601 were whipped, branded with iron, or (mostly the young ones) sent into exile. The investigation and executions continued up until 1707. The Moscow regiments, which had not participated in the uprising, were later disbanded. Streltsy and their family members were removed from Moscow.

Bibliography
 Herd, Graeme P. "Modernizing the muscovite military: The systemic shock of 1698." Journal of Slavic Military Studies 14.4 (2001): 110–130.
Alexander Moutchnik: Der "Strelitzen-Aufstand" von 1698, in: Volksaufstände in Russland. Von der Zeit der Wirren bis zur "Grünen Revolution" gegen die Sowjetherrschaft, hrsg. von Heinz-Dietrich Löwe. Forschungen zur osteuropäischen Geschichte, Bd. 65, Harrassowitz Verlag, Wiesbaden, 2006, S. 163–196.  (The Streltsy Uprising of 1698)

References

Moscow rebellions
1698 in Europe
Conflicts in 1698
17th-century rebellions
1698 in Russia
17th century in Moscow
Peter the Great